The First Lady Tour is a music concert tour by American R&B singer Faith Evans, and supports her gold selling album The First Lady, visiting cities throughout North America. The trek started on June 18 in Pittsburgh, PA at the WAMO Summer Jam concert featuring Master P, Common, Teairra Mari and Cassidy.

Following the North American outing, Evans performed additional dates in Europe. To support the album and tour, BET aired, "An Evening with The First Lady", showcasing Evans performing songs from the album.

Kameelah Williams, lead singer of the R&B female group 702, joined the tour as a background singer and contributed backing vocals on a few songs on Faith's The First Lady album. At select dates Williams showcased her vocal skills during Faith's introduction of her Band.

Opening acts

KeKe Wyatt
Anthony David

Set list
 "All Night Long"
 "Burnin' Up"
 "Love Like This"
 "Can't Believe"
 "I Love You"
 "No Other Love"
 "Come Over"
 "Soon as I Get Home"
 "Ain't Nobody"
 Notorious B.I.G. Tribute: "Hypnotize" / "One More Chance" / "Juicy" / "Mo Money Mo Problems"
 "Faithful" (Interlude) / "Faithfully"
 "Alone in This World"
 "Fallin' in Love"
 "You Used to Love Me"
 "You Gets No Love"
 "Never Gonna Let You Go"
 "Goin' Out"
 "Jealous"
 "Again"
 "Get Over You"
 "Tru Love"
 "I Don't Need It"
Encore
 "Stop N Go"
 "Mesmerized"

Notes
 The set list included a tribute to her ex-husband rapper the Notorious B.I.G., that consisted of a DJ medley of his pop hit songs.

Tour dates

Festivals and other miscellaneous performances
WAMA Summer Jam
Taste of Chicago
Comerica TasteFest
Rochester MusicFest
Ohio State Fair
Cincinnati Jazz Festival

References

External links
FaithEvansMusic.com
Faith Evans myspace page

Faith Evans concert tours
2005 concert tours